The Russian frigate Sankt Nikolai was sunk in the Baltic Gulf of Finland in the Battle of Svensksund in 1790. She was found in 1948 almost intact in the sea bottom outside the modern city of Kotka. Over 2300 objects have been recovered from her hull by divers.

References
 Фрегат Св. Николай (in Russian)
 St. Nikolai

Frigates of the Imperial Russian Navy
Shipwrecks in the Baltic Sea
Shipwrecks of Finland
Maritime incidents in 1790